George Knox was an Irish member of the United Kingdom parliament.

George Knox may also refer to:
George Knox (died 1741), Irish MP for county Donegal
Sir George Edward Knox, (1845–1922) British judge in India
George Hodges Knox (1885–1960), Australian politician
George L. Knox Escaped slave, activist, publisher and author
George L. Knox II, U.S. Army Air Force Officer and Tuskegee Airman
George William Knox (1853–1912), American theologian
George Williams Knox CB (1838–1894), British soldier

See also
Knox (surname)

Disambiguation pages